Joane K. Mathews is a retired brigadier general in the Wisconsin Army National Guard.

Career and education
Mathews received her commission in the United States Army through the Reserve Officers' Training Corps in 1986 and was assigned to the United States Army Aviation School. She later flew in several missions during Operation Provide Comfort.

In 1997, Mathews transferred to the Wisconsin Army National Guard. She was named Chief of Staff in 2013. In 2016, Mathews was promoted to brigadier general by Governor Scott Walker and was appointed Assistant Adjutant General for Readiness and Training. In 2020, Mathews was nominated for promotion to major general.

Decorations Mathews has received include the Legion of Merit with oak leaf cluster, Meritorious Service Medal with two oak leaf clusters, the Army Commendation Medal with two oak leaf clusters, the Army Achievement Medal, the National Defense Service Medal and the Master Army Aviator Badge.

Mathews is a graduate of Lakeland Union High School in Minocqua, Wisconsin. Other schools she attended include the University of North Dakota, the United States Army War College and the United States Army Command and General Staff College.

She retired in 2022.

References

People from Minocqua, Wisconsin
Military personnel from Madison, Wisconsin
National Guard (United States) generals
Female generals of the United States Army
Wisconsin National Guard personnel
American Master Army Aviators
Recipients of the Legion of Merit
Ojibwe people
University of North Dakota alumni
United States Army War College alumni
United States Army Command and General Staff College alumni
Living people
Year of birth missing (living people)
21st-century American women